The 2008 Miami RedHawks football team represented the Miami University in the 2008 NCAA Division I FBS football season. The team competed as a member of the East Division of the Mid-American Conference (MAC) and finished the season with a 2–10 record and a 1–7 record in conference games. The RedHawks were led by fourth-year head coach Shane Montgomery, who resigned after the season.

Schedule

References

Miami
Miami RedHawks football seasons
Miami RedHawks football